USS LST-906 was an  in the United States Navy. Like many of her class, she was not named and is properly referred to by her hull designation.

Construction
LST-906 was laid down on 24 January 1944, at Hingham, Massachusetts, by the Bethlehem-Hingham Shipyard; launched on 11 March 1944; sponsored by Mrs. Henry Levine; and commissioned on 27 April 1944.

Service history

During World War II, LST-906 was assigned to the European Theatre.

While in the Mediterranean, Seabees converted LST-906 into a makeshift aircraft carrier sporting a custom-built mesh airstrip above deck. She was the base for six USAAF L-4B "Grasshoppers" flown as artillery spotters for the US 3rd Infantry Division during the invasion of southern France in September 1944. LST-906 was one of six LSTs to be converted.

While at anchor at Leghorn, Italy, heavy seas on 18 October 1944 caused LST-906 to drag anchor and run aground. On 6 December a storm caused further damage to the still-grounded ship.

The ship was decommissioned on 20 May 1945, struck from the Navy list on 22 June 1945, and sold for scrap soon thereafter.

Awards
LST-906 earned one battle star for World War II service.

Notes

Citations

Bibliography 

Online resources
 
 
 
Printed resources

External links
 

 

LST-542-class tank landing ships
World War II amphibious warfare vessels of the United States
Ships built in Hingham, Massachusetts
1944 ships